Philippsburg is a town in the district of Karlsruhe, Baden-Württemberg, Germany.

History
Before 1632, Philippsburg was known as "Udenheim".

The city was a possession of the Bishop of Speyer from 1371–1718. The town is named after Philipp Christoph von Sötern, who was bishop from 1610–1652. It was ruled by France between 1644 and 1676 and again between 1688 and 1697. The city became part of the Grand Duchy of Baden in 1803.

Historically, possession of the town was disputed between Germany and France.
Formerly, there was a fortress located at the town, whose location was mentioned by Carl von Clausewitz. In Book VI of On War, he suggested that "If a fortress cannot be located directly on a river, it is better not to place it in the immediate vicinity, but some fifty to sixty miles away; otherwise the river will cut through and interfere with its sphere of influence with respect to all the points mentioned above." He then mentions in a footnote "Philippsburg was a perfect example of how not to site a fortress. Its location was that of an idiot standing with his nose against the wall.". The fortress was besieged in 1688, and 1734, and during the War of the Second Coalition.

Miscellaneous
The town is the site of the Philippsburg Nuclear Power Plant and a Goodyear Tire and Rubber Company plant.

People 
 Franz Burda (1903-1986), publisher

Bibliography
The siege of Philippsburg is covered in Clausewitz's campaign history.
 Clausewitz, Carl von (2021). The Coalition Crumbles, Napoleon Returns: The 1799 Campaign in Italy and Switzerland, Volume 2. Trans and ed. Nicholas Murray and Christopher Pringle. Lawrence, Kansas: University Press of Kansas.

References

External links

 Official website 
 - Note that this is a link to the free, outdated 1873 translation of On War
 Translation of German Wikipedia article, which is much more complete

Towns in Baden-Württemberg
Karlsruhe (district)
Populated places on the Rhine
Vauban fortifications